The Stevens Model 77E was a pump-action shotgun offered in 12 gauge, 16 gauge, 20 gauge, 28 gauge, and 410 gauge. The military version 77E was the most widely used shotgun of the Vietnam War. It was a short-barreled pump-action shotgun known variously as the "trench" or "riot" shotgun in 12 gauge. The Military Model 77E had a noticeably shorter stocks than similar United States military shotguns built by Ithaca Gun Company, Remington Arms, and Winchester Repeating Arms Company. These short stocks were intended to accommodate South Vietnamese soldiers, and the Military Model 77E was the first United States combat shotgun equipped with a rubber recoil pad. Military Model 77E shotguns were Parkerized with sling swivels and wooden stocks. Receivers were marked "U.S." and "p" proofmarks appeared on both barrels and receivers.

A few prototypes were fitted with bayonet adapters, but none are known to have been issued. A few Stevens Model 69R shotguns also saw service during the Vietnam War. The Model 77E gave satisfactory service, but proved less durable than the Ithaca Model 37. Breakage at the point of attachment of the buttstock to the receiver was the most common complaint.

Users

References

Pump-action shotguns
United States Marine Corps equipment
Shotguns of the United States
Stevens Arms
Military equipment introduced in the 1960s